Goulburn, also known as Goulburn Scour, is a rock outcrop on the surface of Aeolis Palus, between Peace Vallis and Aeolis Mons ("Mount Sharp"), in Gale crater on the planet Mars.  The outcrop was encountered by the Curiosity rover on landing at the Bradbury Landing on August 6, 2012 (the 1st sol of the mission) and is named after a two-billion year-old sequence of rocks in Northern Canada.  The "approximate" site coordinates are: .

The outcrop is a well-sorted gravel conglomerate, containing well-rounded, smooth, abraded pebbles. Occasional pebbles up to a few centimeters across are embedded in amongst a matrix of finer rounded particles, up to a centimeter across. It has been interpreted as a fluvial sediment, deposited by a vigorously flowing stream, probably between ankle and waist deep. This stream is part of an ancient alluvial fan, which descends from the steep terrain at the rim of Gale crater across its floor.

Gallery

See also

 Aeolis quadrangle 
 Bedrock
 Composition of Mars 
 Geology of Mars 
 Hottah (Mars)
 Link (Mars)
 List of rocks on Mars
 Rock outcrop
 Timeline of Mars Science Laboratory
 Water on Mars

References

External links 
Curiosity Rover - Official Site
NASA - Mars Exploration Program 
Volcanic rock classification 
Video (04:32) - Evidence: Water "Vigorously" Flowed On Mars - September, 2012

Aeolis quadrangle
Mars Science Laboratory
Rocks on Mars